Oscar Chaplin III (February 22, 1980 – February 4, 2022) was an American Olympic weightlifter.

Chaplin III represented United States in weightlifting in the 1990s and 2000s. He competed at 77 and 85 kilograms. He won the 2000 Junior World Championships at 77 kilograms with a 155-kilogram snatch and 187.5-kilogram clean & jerk for a total of 342.5 kilograms. Chaplin was the only American man to win a world-level event for 16 years (Clarence "CJ" Cummings won 2016 Junior Worlds).

In 1999, Chaplin set the American snatch record at 77 kilograms with a 157.5-kilogram lift. In 2002, he set the 85-kilogram snatch record with a 166-kilogram lift. Both of those American records stood from when he set them until the International Weightlifting Federation (IWF) re-organized the bodyweight categories in 2018.

He died in Savannah, Georgia on February 4, 2022, at the age of 41.

Weightlifting achievements
Junior World Champion (2000)
Olympic team member (2000 & 2004)
Multiple All-Time Junior and Senior American record holder in the snatch, clean and jerk, and total
Multiple Junior and Senior American record holder in snatch, clean and jerk, and total (1993–1997)
Attended three IWF Junior World Championships (1998, 1999, 2000)
Competed in four IWF Senior World Championships (1998, 1999, 2002, 2003)

References

External links
Oscar Chaplin III - International Weightlifting Federation Website
Oscar Chaplin III - Hall of Fame at Weightlifting Exchange
 

1980 births
2022 deaths
20th-century African-American sportspeople
21st-century African-American sportspeople
American male weightlifters
Olympic weightlifters of the United States
Weightlifters at the 2000 Summer Olympics
Weightlifters at the 2004 Summer Olympics
Weightlifters at the 1999 Pan American Games
Pan American Games bronze medalists for the United States
Pan American Games medalists in weightlifting
Medalists at the 1999 Pan American Games
Sportspeople from Savannah, Georgia